Brian Miller may refer to:

Brian A. Miller, American television producer
Brian D. Miller (attorney), American attorney
Brian Miller (actor) (born 1941), British actor
Brian Miller (Australian politician) (1921–2014), member of the Tasmanian Legislative Council
Brian Miller (baseball) (born 1995)
Brian Miller (footballer) (1937–2007), former professional footballer and England international
Brian Miller (musician), musician in the band Isotope
Brian Miller (New York politician), member of the New York State Assembly
Brian Miller (Still Standing)
Brian Stacy Miller (born 1967), U.S. federal judge

See also
Brian Millar (born 1966), Irish cricketer
Bryan Miller (disambiguation)